Platylithophycus is an extinct genus of elasmobranchs that lived during the Late Cretaceous. It is known from a single specimen from the Niobrara Formation of Kansas. It was originally identified as the fronds of a codiacean alga, then later as the cuttlebone of a cuttlefish. It was most recently reidentified as the gill arches and rakers of an elasmobranch of uncertain affinities. It might have been a filter feeding mackerel shark related to Aquilolamna.

References

Elasmobranchii
Prehistoric cartilaginous fish genera